An Aerobie is a flying ring used in a manner similar to a chakram or flying disc (Frisbee), for recreational catches between two or more individuals. Its ring shape of only about  thickness
makes the Aerobie lighter and more stable in flight than a disc.
It can be bent to tune it for straighter flight.
Since it has very low drag and good stability, it can be thrown much farther than a flying disc. The Aerobie was used to set two former world records for thrown objects.

Designed in 1984 by Stanford engineering lecturer Alan Adler, the Aerobie has a polycarbonate core with soft rubber bumpers molded onto the inner and outer rims. The outer rim has a spoiler designed to impart stability.

History
In the 1970s, Alan Adler began attempting to improve the flying disc, considering its design characteristics. He tried streamlining the shape to reduce drag, but this resulted in a disc that was more unstable in flight. Eventually, inspired by British accounts of deadly Indian weaponry and martial arts, he turned his attention to the ring shape of the chakram, a formidable Punjabi weapon used by the Sikh of India. This led to the development of the predecessor of the Aerobie, which was called the "Skyro". About a million of this model were sold. It lacked the spoiler rim of the Aerobie. It had low drag but was stable at only a certain speed. The later introduction of the spoiler, which balanced the lift, made the ring stable "over a wide range of speeds". After testing several models, the ideal shape was found, and the Aerobie was produced. Adler founded Superflight, Inc. (later known as Aerobie, Inc.) in 1984. 

In 2017, the assets of the Aerobie flying ring and other Aerobie assets were sold to Swimways, a subsidiary of Spin Master, and the company was renamed to AeroPress, Inc.

Characteristics
The Aerobie allows for throws over unusually long distances. It flies faster and farther than a common flying disc. When well tuned, it can fly in a straight line, "like a puck on an invisible sheet of ice". It does not have the tendency to roll when thrown level, as a flying disc does. But similarly to a disc, an Aerobie can be thrown in a curved path by throwing it in a slant. Its lift depends on its speed relative to the air. Therefore, throwing into the wind makes it fly higher. Throwing with the wind makes it fly lower.

Advantages
The Aerobie's ring shape allows it to be caught in a variety of different ways. For example, it can be caught by thrusting a forearm, the head (when the ring is thrown high), or even a foot through the middle. Games such as "Aerosticks" and Aerogoal are designed specifically for the Aerobie.

Disadvantages, special care
An Aerobie ring does not float in water.  It can be easier to lose than a flying disc, especially over long distances: its low profile can make it hard to spot on the ground, and, in particular, it gets caught on tree branches more easily.

The Aerobie is best thrown in a wide open area such as a football or soccer field, away from bodies of water, roofs, trees, roads, etc. Adequate light is important.

World records
The  Aerobie Pro was used to set the Guinness World Record twice for the "longest throw of an object without any velocity-aiding feature". Hemmings' Aerobie was airborne for 30 seconds (not an official measurement) and was the first thrown object to break the quarter-mile barrier (402 meters or 1,320 feet).

It does not appear that this was recorded by Guinness. On June 7, 1988, the Aerobie became the first object to be thrown across Niagara Falls with a throw by Scott Zimmerman. In April 1987, Zimmerman threw a silver dollar taped to an Aerobie across the Potomac River.

Since the introduction of the Aerobie, Superflight has offered reward money for various landmark throws. While details of the earlier rewards are unclear, the current reward is $1,000 to anyone who sets the Guinness World Distance Record.

See also
 Boomerang
 Chakram
 Frisbee
 Lee-Richards annular monoplane

Further reading

References

External links
Official website
 by Alan Adler, filed May 10, 1984, issued December 24, 1985.
Youtube Video Video of Aerobie products in action, including throwing one of the rings out of the Aloha Stadium in Hawaii, and the demonstration of the Aerobie Orbiter
 Official Hungarian Aerobie Website
Aerobie Frisbee Product Overview

Physical activity and dexterity toys
Exercise equipment
1980s toys